|}

The Prix Exbury is a Group 3 flat horse race in France open to thoroughbreds aged four years or older. It is run over a distance of 2,000 metres (about 1¼ miles) at Saint-Cloud in March.

History
The event was originally called the Prix Boiard. It was named after Boiard, a successful racehorse in the 1870s. It was established in 1891, and initially run at Maisons-Laffitte over 2,000 metres. It was open to horses aged three or older.

The race was renamed in memory of Eugène Adam (1840–1904), a former president of the Société Sportive d'Encouragement, in 1905. It reverted to its original title when the present Prix Eugène Adam was given its name in 1911.

The Prix Boiard was abandoned from 1915 to 1918. It was contested at Saint-Cloud over 2,100 metres in 1919. It returned to Maisons-Laffitte in 1920, and began a longer spell at Saint-Cloud in 1929. Its distance was 2,100 metres in 1931 and 1932.

The event was held at Longchamp from 1940 to 1942. It was run at Le Tremblay over 2,150 metres in 1943, and Maisons-Laffitte over 2,200 metres in 1944 and 1945. It returned to Saint-Cloud in 1946.

The race was won by a horse called Exbury in 1963, and it was renamed in his honour in 1969. From this point it was closed to three-year-olds. It was given Group 3 status in 1971.

The Prix Exbury is usually France's first Group race of the year.

Records
Most successful horse (2 wins):
 Fourire – 1899, 1900
 Macdonald II – 1904, 1905
 Djebel – 1941, 1942
 Un Gaillard – 1943, 1944
 Yaxilio – 1970, 1971
 Mister Sic Top – 1972, 1973
 Chinchon – 2010, 2012

Leading jockey (7 wins):
 Olivier Peslier – Matarun (1994), Gunboat Diplomacy (1996), Nero Zilzal (1997), Loup Sauvage (1998), Court  (2009), Polytechnicien (2011), Chinchon (2012)

Leading trainer (10 wins):
 André Fabre – Al Nasr (1982), Imyar (1983), Mille Balles (1984), Village Star (1987), Tuesday's Special (1995), Loup Sauvage (1998), Polish Summer (2004), Polytechnicien (2011), Cloth of Stars (2017), Soleil Marin (2019)

Leading owner (7 wins):
 Marcel Boussac – Goyescas (1933), Goya II (1940), Djebel (1941, 1942), Ardan (1945), Goyama (1947), Nirgal (1948)

Winners since 1981

Earlier winners

 1891: Sledge
 1892: Courlis
 1893: Hoche
 1894: Fousi Yama
 1895: Merlin
 1896: Omnium II
 1897: Castelnau
 1898: Quilda
 1899: Fourire
 1900: Fourire
 1901: Codoman
 1902: Cheri
 1903: La Camargo
 1904: Macdonald II
 1905: Macdonald II
 1906: Prestige
 1907: Maintenon
 1908: Biniou
 1909: Verdun
 1910: Lieutel
 1911: Badajoz
 1912: Martial
 1913: Isard
 1914: Nimbus
 1915–18: no race
 1919: Mont Saint Eloi
 1920: Tchad
 1921: Souviens Toi
 1922: Cid Campeador
 1923: Niceas
 1924: Sir Gallahad
 1925: Le Capucin
 1926: Cerulea
 1927: King's Darling
 1928: Motrico
 1929: Tuvari
 1930: Mysarch
 1931: Le Tourbillon
 1932: Parsee
 1933: Goyescas
 1934: Le Centaure
 1935: Farfadette
 1936: Renette
 1937: Le Calme
 1938: Sanguinetto
 1939: Feerie
 1940: Goya II
 1941: Djebel
 1942: Djebel
 1943: Un Gaillard
 1944: Un Gaillard
 1945: Ardan
 1946: Oural
 1947: Goyama
 1948: Nirgal
 1949: Tharsis
 1950: Wild Mec
 1951: Alizier
 1952: L'Aiglon
 1953: Fine Top
 1954: Banassa
 1955: Soleil Levant
 1956: Tropique
 1957: Fric
 1958: Mon Triomphe
 1959: Tombeur
 1960: Siva
 1961: Djebel Traffic
 1962: Match
 1963: Exbury
 1964: Prima Donna
 1965: Free Ride
 1966: Diatome
 1967: Claquesous
 1968: Taglietto
 1969: Carmarthen
 1970: Yaxilio
 1971: Yaxilio
 1972: Mister Sic Top
 1973: Mister Sic Top
 1974: Shari
 1975: no race *
 1976: Citoyen
 1977: Cheraw
 1978: Pappagallo
 1979: Tempus Fugit
 1980: Kamaridaan
</div>
* The 1975 running was abandoned because of snow.

See also
 List of French flat horse races
 Recurring sporting events established in 1891  – this race is included under its original title, Prix Boiard.

References

 France Galop / Racing Post:
 france-galop.com – A Brief History: Prix Exbury.
 galop.courses-france.com – Prix Exbury – Palmarès depuis 1980.
 galopp-sieger.de – Prix Exbury (ex Prix Boiard).
 horseracingintfed.com – International Federation of Horseracing Authorities – Prix Exbury (2020).
 pedigreequery.com – Prix Exbury – Saint-Cloud.

Open middle distance horse races
Saint-Cloud Racecourse
Horse races in France
1891 establishments in France